Said Khalifa Gouda (16 April 1930 – December 2014) was an Egyptian male weightlifter who competed in the featherweight and Lightweight class and represented Egypt at international competitions. He won the gold medal at the 1951 World Weightlifting Championships in the 60 kg category. He also competed in the men's featherweight event at the 1952 Summer Olympics.

References

External links
Khalifa Said Gouda Bio, Stats, and Results | Olympics at Sports-Reference.com

1930 births
2014 deaths
Egyptian male weightlifters
World Weightlifting Championships medalists
Place of birth missing
Olympic weightlifters of Egypt
Weightlifters at the 1952 Summer Olympics
20th-century Egyptian people
21st-century Egyptian people